Tolegnaro is a genus of spiders in the family Oonopidae. It was first described in 2012 by Álvarez-Padilla, Ubick & Griswold. , it contains 2 species, both found in Madagascar.

References

Oonopidae
Araneomorphae genera
Spiders of Madagascar